Proterochyta is a monotypic moth genus in the family Scythrididae. Its only species, Proterochyta epicoena is found in Mozambique, Namibia, Zimbabwe and Gauteng, South Africa. Both the genus and species were first described by Edward Meyrick in 1914.

The wingspan is about 13–14 mm. The forewings are whitish with some scattered light brownish scales in the disc and posteriorly. The hindwings are grey.

References

Scythrididae
Moths described in 1914
Monotypic moth genera